The Société d'aquarellistes français, often in uncontracted form as Société des aquarellistes français, was an association of painters in watercolour in nineteenth-century France. It held annual exhibitions of works by members; the first of these was held in the gallery of Paul Durand-Ruel at 16 rue Laffitte, Paris, in 1879. The society ceased to be active in 1896.

Members

In 1879, the honorary members of the society were:

 Prince de Joinville
 Édouard André
 Emmanuel Bocher
 Maurice Cottier
 Auguste Dreyfus
 Alexandre Dumas
 Viscount Étienne de Ganay
 Viscount Henri Greffulhe
 Alfred Hartmann
 Baron Edmond de Rothschild
 Count Samuel Welles de la Valette

In 1879, the ordinary members were:

 Henri Baron
 Charles-Édouard de Beaumont
 Édouard Detaille
 Gustave Doré
 François-Louis Français
 Ferdinand Heilbuth
 Eugène Isabey
 Jules Jacquemart
 Roger Jourdain
 Louis-Eugène Lambert
 Eugène Lami
 Louis Leloir
 Maurice Leloir
 Madeleine Lemaire
 Baroness Charlotte de Rothschild
 Jehan Georges Vibert
 Jules Worms

By 1890 the membership had expanded to include:

 Emile Adan
 Jean Béraud
 Albert Besnard
 Gaston Béthune
 Emile Boilvin
 Léon Bonnat
 Maurice Boutet de Monvel
 John Lewis Brown
 Jean-Charles Cazin
 Max Claude
 Georges Claude
 Benjamin-Constant
 Maurice Courant
 Robert de Cuvillon
 Charles Édouard Delort
 Guillaume Dubufe
 Ernest Duez
 Nicolas Escalier
 François Flameng
 Émile Friant
 Victor Gilbert
 Lucien Gros
 Henri Harpignies
 Pierre-Georges Jeanniot
 Roger Jourdain
 Eugène Lambert
 Jean-Paul Laurens
 Julien Le Blant
 Léon Lhermitte
 Auguste Loustaunau
 Albert Maignan
 Adrien Marie
 Charles Meissonier
 Eugène Morand
 Adrien Moreau
 Aimé Morot
 Charles Olivier de Penne
 Paul Pujol
 James Tissot
 Edmond Yon
 Henri Zuber

References

French artist groups and collectives
Arts organizations based in France
Arts organizations established in the 19th century